Institute of Advanced Research (IAR), also known as University and Institute of Advanced Research, is a private university located in Gandhinagar, Gujarat, India. The university was established in 2011 by the Puri Foundation for Education in India through The Gujarat Private Universities (Amendment) Act, 2011.

References

External links

Universities in Gujarat
Educational institutions established in 2011
2011 establishments in Gujarat
Private universities in India
Education in Gandhinagar